Globe Newspaper Co. v. Walker, 210 U.S. 356 (1908), was a United States Supreme Court case in which the Court held Congress having provided a remedy for those whose copyrights in maps are infringed, a civil action at common law for money damages cannot be maintained against the infringers.

References

External links
 

1908 in United States case law
United States copyright case law
United States Supreme Court cases
United States Supreme Court cases of the Fuller Court